Erik Rondell (born July 8, 1967) (sometimes credited as "Eric Rondell", "Erick Rondell", "Erik L. Rondell") is an American actor, stuntman, and stunt co-ordinator with an almost forty year career in film and television. He is best known for his work on 24 and Nebraska and many more major series and movie franchises, plus most recently portraying the character of Johnny Horne in Twin Peaks: The Return.

Career 
Rondell started his career in Hollywood in 1982 or 1983, working on the film Private School, followed by several others, including: Dances with Wolves, Blade, Pearl Harbor, The Matrix Reloaded, and Captain America: The Winter Soldier.

Rondell has also worked on TV shows like True Detective, Sleeper Cell, Heroes, Westworld, NCIS: Los Angeles, True Blood, and Gilmore Girls.

He has also co-ordinated stunts for TV shows, films, music videos, and commercials.

As both a stuntman and actor, he is also known for his work on 24 (stunts and several acting roles), Nebraska, Hurricane Heist, Daredevil, Gangster Squad, Ant-Man and the Wasp, The Patriot, The Darkest Minds, Blue Streak, G.I. Joe: Rise of the Cobra, Waterworld, Deep Blue Sea, The Million Dollar Hotel, and many other television series and movies.

Recently, he is now known for being one of three actors to portray the character of Johnny Horne in Twin Peaks, playing him in two episodes of the revival, Twin Peaks: The Return in 2017, replacing Robert Davenport, who played the character in the pilot, and Robert Bauer, who played him in four episodes of the original series. He has also recently acted in Agents of S.H.I.E.L.D in 2020.

Filmography

Film

Television

Stunts / Stunt Co-ordinator 

(Table needs to be added. For credits, see: Talk:Erik Rondell#Filmography Table for Stunt Roles.)

References

External links
 

American actors
American stunt performers
Stunt performers